This is the list of the 16 elected members of the European Parliament for Denmark in the 1994 to 1999 session.

List

Notes

External links
 List of Danish MEPs (in Danish)

1994
List
Denmark